Teracotona subterminata is a moth of the family Erebidae. It is found in Eritrea, Ethiopia, Kenya and Tanzania.

References

Moths described in 1901
Spilosomina
Moths of Africa